Helen Hanft (April 4, 1934 – May 30, 2013) was an American actress.

Early life
Hanft was born in the Bronx, the eldest of three daughters born to Esther and Benjamin Hanft. Her father was a prominent public relations executive for several national Jewish organizations. Her father persuaded her to audition for the High School of Performing Arts, now part of Fiorello H. LaGuardia High School of Music & Art and Performing Arts, and she was admitted.

Career
Hanft started her theatrical career in the early 1960s in the experimental theater movement at Off-Off-Broadway venues like La MaMa Experimental Theatre Club and Caffe Cino. She quickly became known as "the Ethel Merman of off-off-Broadway" for her comedic performances. Hanft often played eccentric, raunchy characters, and was featured in many plays by Tom Eyen, including:

 My Next Husband Will Be a Beauty! (1964)
 Frustrata (1964, 1965)
 The Demented World of Tom Eyen (1965)
 Why Hanna's Skirt Won't Stay Down (1965, 1971, 1981)
 The White Whore and the Bit Player (1965; she also appeared in the Cannon Films adaptation)
 Sarah B. Divine! (1967)
 Who Killed My Bald Sister Sophie? (1969)
 What is Making Gilda So Gray? (1970)
 Women Behind Bars (1975)
 The Neon Woman (1978; co-starring Divine) 
 Give My Regards to Off Off Broadway (1987)
 Areatha in the Ice Palace

She performed in David Rabe's In the Boom Boom Room at Joseph Papp's Public Theater, John Patrick Shanley's Italian American Reconciliation, and multiple plays by Stephen Holt, including Reety in Hell. Hanft also appeared in the following productions at La MaMa during the 1960s and 1970s:

 Merrill Williams' At the Corner of Popcorn Alley and the 21st of September Street (1965)
 H.M. Koutoukas' Omy Queen of the Fairies and Tidy Passions, or, Kill Kaleidascope Kill (1965)
 Paul Foster's The Madonna in the Orchard (1966) directed by Tom O'Horgan
 Howard Greenberger and Robert Reinhold's Our Play on the Future Has No Name (1970)
 Stephen Holt's The Kitty Glitter Story (1974)
 Jeff Klayman's Density 1.33 (1976)
 Holt's O My Rosey Dreams (1983)

Additionally, she appeared in Stoop; Bambi Levine, Please Shut Up!; and as Judy Garland dying in her bathroom in London Loo. She appeared as herself in two documentary features: Beautiful Darling, about Candy Darling; and I Am Divine, about Divine.

In the mid-1970s, Hanft began appearing in movies, sometimes in cameo roles. Her film credits include the Woody Allen films Manhattan, Stardust Memories, The Purple Rose of Cairo, and Allen's segment in New York Stories. She was also a favorite of Paul Mazursky, who cast her in Next Stop, Greenwich Village and Willie & Phil. Other film appearances include Arthur, Honky Tonk Freeway, Moonstruck, License to Drive, Coming to America, and Used People. In the late 1990s, she began appearing on episodes of Law & Order, and continued to make occasional stage appearances in New York City.

Personal life
Her husband, William Landers, predeceased her, as did her younger sister, Alice. She is survived by her other sister, Sarah Comma.

She died in Manhattan on May 30, 2013, of a post-surgical intestinal blockage.

Filmography

References

External links

Hanft's page on La MaMa Archives Digital Collections

1934 births
2013 deaths
American film actresses
American stage actresses
American television actresses
Jewish American actresses
Actresses from New York City
20th-century American actresses
21st-century American actresses
21st-century American Jews
Deaths from bowel obstruction